Epigonus is a genus of fish in the family Epigonidae found in the Atlantic, Indian and Pacific Ocean. The genus was erected by Constantine Samuel Rafinesque in 1810.

Species
There are currently 37 recognized species in this genus:
 Epigonus affinis Parin & Abramov, 1986 (smooth-nose deep-water cardinalfish) 
 Epigonus angustifrons Abramov & Manilo, 1987
 Epigonus atherinoides (C. H. Gilbert, 1905) 
 Epigonus carbonarius Okamoto & Motomura, 2011 (charcoal deep-water cardinalfish) 
 Epigonus cavaticus H. Ida, Okamoto & Sakaue, 2007 (Palauan deep-water cardinalfish)
 Epigonus chilensis Okamoto, 2012 
 Epigonus constanciae (Giglioli, 1880)
 Epigonus crassicaudus F. de Buen, 1959
 Epigonus ctenolepis Mochizuki & Shirakihara, 1983 
 Epigonus denticulatus Dieuzeide, 1950 (pencil deep-water cardinalfish)
 Epigonus devaneyi Gon, 1985
 Epigonus draco Okamoto, 2015 (dragon deep-water cardinalfish) 
 Epigonus elegans Parin & Abramov, 1986
 Epigonus elongatus Parin & Abramov, 1986
 Epigonus exodon Okamoto & Motomura, 2012 
 Epigonus fragilis (D. S. Jordan & E. K. Jordan, 1922)
 Epigonus glossodontus Gon, 1985
 Epigonus heracleus Parin & Abramov, 1986 (Hercules deep-water cardinalfish) 
 Epigonus indicus IDREES BABU & AKHILESH 2020
 Epigonus lenimen (Whitley, 1935) (big-eyed deep-water cardinalfish)
 Epigonus lifouensis Okamoto & Motomura, 2013 (Loyalty deep-water cardinalfish) 
 Epigonus machaera Okamoto, 2012 
 Epigonus macrops (A. B. Brauer, 1906) (luminous deep-water cardinalfish)
 Epigonus marimonticolus Parin & Abramov, 1986
 Epigonus marisrubri Krupp, Zajonz & Khalaf, 2009 (Red Sea deep-water cardinalfish)
 Epigonus mayeri Okamoto, 2011 (Angolan deep-water cardinalfish) 
 Epigonus megalops (H. M. Smith & Radcliffe, 1912) 
 Epigonus notacanthus Parin & Abramov, 1986
 Epigonus occidentalis Goode & T. H. Bean, 1896 (western deep-water cardinalfish)
 Epigonus oligolepis G. F. Mayer, 1974
 Epigonus pandionis (Goode & T. H. Bean, 1881) 
 Epigonus parini Abramov, 1987 
 Epigonus pectinifer G. F. Mayer, 1974
 Epigonus robustus (Barnard, 1927) (robust deep-water cardinalfish)
 Epigonus telescopus (A. Risso, 1810) (black deep-water cardinalfish)
 Epigonus thai Prokofiev & Bussarawit, 2012 
 Epigonus tuberculatus Okamoto & Motomura, 2013 (Keeling deep-water cardinalfish) 
 Epigonus waltersensis Parin & Abramov, 1986

References

Epigonidae
Perciformes genera
Marine fish genera
Taxa named by Constantine Samuel Rafinesque